Ethalia is a genus of sea snails, marine gastropod mollusks in the subfamily Umboniinae  of the family Trochidae, the top snails.

Description
The species are moderate-sized. The orbicular shell is turbinately depressed. The whorls are convex, smooth or transversely striated, the last one rounded at the periphery. They have a mottled or streaked color-pattern. The umbilicus is partly closed by a callus deposit. The columellar lip ends anteriorly in an obtuse dilated callus. The callus emitted at the columellar-parietal angle of the
aperture is tongue-shaped, closing the umbilicus except a rather narrow chink, or even entirely, in some species.

Distribution
This marine genus occurs in the Central and East Indian Ocean, off East Africa, off Indo-Malaysia, and off Australia.

Species
Species within the genus Ethalia include:
 Ethalia bellardii (Issel, 1869)
 Ethalia bysma Herbert, 1992
 Ethalia carneolata Melvill, 1897
 Ethalia catharinae Poppe, Tagaro & Dekker, 2006
 Ethalia electra Herbert, 1992
 Ethalia gilchristae Herbert, 1992
 Ethalia guamensis (Quoy & Gaimard, 1834)
 Ethalia minolina Melvill, 1897
 Ethalia nitida A. Adams, 1863
 Ethalia omphalotropis A. Adams, 1863
 Ethalia polita A. Adams, 1862
 Ethalia rufula Gould, 1861
 Ethalia sanguinea Pilsbry, 1905
 Ethalia striolata (A. Adams, 1855)

Species brought into synonymy
 Ethalia (Ethaliella) Pilsbry, 1905: synonym of Ethaliella Pilsbry, 1905
 Ethalia candida A. Adams, 1862: synonym of Leucorhynchia candida (A. Adams, 1862)
 Ethalia capillata Gould, 1862: synonym of Ethaliella capillata (Gould, 1862)
 Ethalia floccata G. B. Sowerby III, 1903: synonym of Ethaliella floccata (Sowerby, 1903)
 Ethalia lirata E.A. Smith, 1871: synonym of Leucorhynchia lirata (E.A. Smith, 1871)
 Ethalia multistriata A. E. Verrill, 1884: synonym of Solariorbis multistriatus (A. E. Verrill, 1884)
 Ethalia perspicua A. Adams, 1861: synonym of Teinostoma perspicuum (A. Adams, 1861)
 Ethalia philippii (A. Adams, 1855): synonym of Monilea philippii A. Adams, 1855
 Ethalia plicata E. A. Smith, 1872: synonym of Leucorhynchia plicata (E. A. Smith, 1872)
 Ethalia pulchella (A. Adams, 1855): synonym of Ethaliella pulchella (A. Adams, 1855)
 Ethalia sobrina A. Adams, 1861: synonym of Lissotesta sobrina (A. Adams, 1861)
 Ethalia striolata Kilburn, 1977: synonym of Ethalia carneolata Melvill, 1897

References

 Wilson, B., 1993. Australian Marine Shells. Prosobranch Gastropods. Odyssey Publishing, Kallaroo, WA
 Higo, S., Callomon, P. & Goto, Y. (1999) Catalogue and Bibliography of the Marine Shell-Bearing Mollusca of Japan. Elle Scientific Publications, Yao, Japan, 749 pp.
 Williams S.T., Karube S. & Ozawa T. (2008) Molecular systematics of Vetigastropoda: Trochidae, Turbinidae and Trochoidea redefined. Zoologica Scripta 37: 483–506.

External links
 Fischer P. (1873-1879). [continuation of Kiener] Spécies général et iconographie des coquilles vivantes. Volume 10, Famille des Turbinacées. Genre Turbo (Turbo), pp. i-iv + 1-128 (1873), pls 1, 28, 44-49, 53-54, 57-120. Volume 11, Genres Troque (Trochus, including Calcar), pp. 1–96, pls 37-86 (1875); 97-144 (1876); 145-240 (1877); 241-336 (1878); 337-423, Xenophora pp. 424–450, Tectarius pp. 451–459, Risella pp. 460–463, Index 464-480 (1879)
 Adams H. & Adams A. (1853-1858). The genera of Recent Mollusca; arranged according to their organization. London, van Voorst.

 
Trochidae
Gastropod genera